The Grove Academy (formerly Harrogate Pupil Referral Service) is a mixed alternative provision secondary school, located in Harrogate, North Yorkshire. It provides for pupils who are unable to attend a mainstream school for reasons including illness or behaviour. The school  had an enrolment of 10 pupils in 2016. Its current headteacher is Catherine Farrell.

In September 2013 the Harrogate Pupil Referral Service converted to academy status under the sponsorship of Schools Partnership Academies Trust (now Delta Academies Trust), reopening as The Grove Academy.

In 2015 it was rated as 'Outstanding' (Grade 1) by Ofsted.

References

External links
 

Schools in Harrogate
Delta schools